Retinopathy of prematurity (ROP), also called retrolental fibroplasia (RLF) and Terry syndrome, is a disease of the eye affecting prematurely born babies generally having received neonatal intensive care, in which oxygen therapy is used due to the premature development of their lungs. It is thought to be caused by disorganized growth of retinal blood vessels which may result in scarring and retinal detachment. ROP can be mild and may resolve spontaneously, but it may lead to blindness in serious cases. Thus, all preterm babies are at risk for ROP, and very low birth-weight is an additional risk factor. Both oxygen toxicity and relative hypoxia can contribute to the development of ROP.

Causes

By the fourth month of pregnancy, the fetal retina has begun to develop vascularization. Such formation of blood vessels appears to be very sensitive to the amount of oxygen supplied, either naturally or artificially. In rare cases ROP has been found in some patients with a mutation in the NDP gene, which is normally associated with the more damaging Norrie disease.

Risk factors

Various risk factors contribute to the development of ROP. They are:
 Prematurity
 High exposure to oxygen
 Low birth weight
 Various types of infections
 Cardiac defects
 Anaemia 
 Low vitamin E level

Pathophysiology

During development, blood vessels grow from the central part of the retina outwards. This process is completed a few weeks before the normal time of delivery. However, in premature babies it is incomplete. If blood vessels grow normally, ROP does not occur. If the vessels grow and branch abnormally the baby develops ROP. These abnormal blood vessels may grow up from the plane of the retina and may bleed inside the eye. When the blood and abnormal vessels are reabsorbed, it may give rise to multiple band like membranes which can pull up the retina, causing detachment of the retina and eventually blindness before 6 months.

Normally, maturation of the retina proceeds in utero, and at term, the medial portion (Nasal retina) of the retina is fully vascularized, while the lateral portion (Temporal retina) is only incompletely vascularized. The normal growth of the blood vessels is directed to relatively low-oxygen areas of the retina, but the vessels remain in the plane of the retina and do not grow into the vitreous humor. If excess oxygen is given, normal blood vessels degrade and cease to develop. When the excess oxygen environment is removed, the blood vessels rapidly begin forming again and grow into the vitreous humor of the eye from the retina.

The key disease element in ROP is fibrovascular proliferation. This is growth of abnormal new vessels; this may regress, but frequently progresses. Associated with the growth of these new vessels is fibrous tissue (scar tissue) that may contract to cause retinal detachment. Multiple factors can determine whether the disease progresses, including overall health, birth weight, the stage of ROP at initial diagnosis, and the presence or absence of "plus disease". Supplemental oxygen exposure, while a risk factor, is not the main risk factor for development of this disease. Restricting supplemental oxygen use reduces the rate of ROP, but may raise the risk of other hypoxia-related systemic complications, including death.

Patients with ROP, particularly those who have developed severe disease needing treatment are at greater risk for strabismus, glaucoma, cataracts and shortsightedness (myopia) later in life and should be examined yearly to help prevent or detect and treat these conditions.

Diagnosis

The stages of ROP disease have been defined by the International Classification of Retinopathy of Prematurity (ICROP).

In older patients, the appearance of the disease is less well described but includes the residua of the ICROP stages as well as secondary retinal responses.

International classification

The system used for describing the findings of active ROP is entitled The International Classification of Retinopathy of Prematurity (ICROP). ICROP uses a number of parameters to describe the disease. They are location (zone) of the disease, the circumferential extent of the disease based on the clock hours, the severity (stage) of the disease and the presence or absence of "Plus Disease". Each aspect of the classification has a technical definition. This classification was used for the major clinical trials. It was revised in 2005.
The zones are centered on the optic nerve. ZoneI is the posterior zone of the retina, defined as the circle with a radius extending from the optic nerve to double the distance to the macula. ZoneII is an annulus with the inner border defined by zoneI and the outer border defined by the radius defined as the distance from the optic nerve to the nasal ora serrata. ZoneIII is the residual temporal crescent of the retina.

The circumferential extent of the disease is described in segments as if the top of the eye were 12 on the face of an analog clock, e.g. stage1 from 4:00 to 7:00. (The extent is a bit less important since the treatment indications from the Early Treatment for ROP.)

The Stages describe the ophthalmoscopic findings at the junction between the vascularized and avascular retina.

 Stage 1 is a faint demarcation line.
 Stage 2 is an elevated ridge. 
 Stage 3 is extraretinal fibrovascular tissue. 
 Stage 4 is sub-total retinal detachment.
 Stage 5 is total retinal detachment.

Plus disease

Plus disease can be present as a major complicating factor at any stage. It is characterised by:
 Significant level of vascular dilation and tortuosity observed at the posterior retinal arterioles. This reflects the increase of blood flow through the retina.
 Vitreous haze and anterior chamber haze
 Iris vascular engorgement
 Persistent tunica vasculosa lentis or immature blood vessels growing over the lens which also restrict the dilatation of the pupils.

Differential diagnosis

The most difficult aspect of the differential diagnosis may arise from the similarity of two other diseases:
 Familial exudative vitreoretinopathy which is a genetic disorder that also disrupts the retinal vascularization in full-term infants.
 Persistent fetal vasculature syndrome also known as persistent hyperplastic primary vitreous that can cause a traction retinal detachment difficult to differentiate but typically unilateral.

Screening

Almost all infants with ROP have a gestational age of 31 weeks or less (regardless of birth weight) or a birth weight of 1250 g (2.76 lbs) or less; these indications are generally used to decide whether a baby should be screened for ROP, but some centres, especially in developing countries  extend birth weight screening criteria to 1500 g (3.3 lbs).

Any premature baby with severe illness in perinatal period (Respiratory distress syndrome, sepsis, blood transfusion, Intra ventricular haemorrhage, apnoeic episodes, etc.) may also be offered ROP screening.

Timing

Retinal examination with scleral depression is generally recommended for patients born before 30–32 weeks gestation, or 4–6 weeks of life, whichever is later. It is then repeated every 1–3 weeks until vascularization is complete (or until disease progression mandates treatment).

Procedure

Following pupillary dilation using eye drops, the retina is examined using a special lighted instrument (an indirect ophthalmoscope). The peripheral portions of the retina are sometimes pushed into view using scleral depression. Examination of the retina of a premature infant is performed to determine how far the retinal blood vessels have grown (the zone), and whether or not the vessels are growing flat along the wall of the eye (the stage). Once the vessels have grown into zoneIII (see below) it is usually safe to discharge the child from further screening for ROP. The stage of ROP refers to the character of the leading edge of growing retinal blood vessels (at the vascular-avascular border).

Monitoring

In order to allow timely intervention, a system of monitoring is undertaken for infants at risk of developing ROP. These monitoring protocols differ geographically because the definition of high-risk is not uniform or perfectly defined. In the USA the consensus statement of experts is informed by data derived by clinical trials and published in Pediatrics 2006. They included infants with birthweights under 1500 grams or under 30 weeks gestation in most cases. The first examination should take place within the first 4 weeks of birth, and regular, weekly examination is required until it is clear that the eyes are not going to develop disease needing treatment, or one or both eyes develop disease requiring treatment. Treatment should be administered within a 48 hours, as the condition can progress rapidly.

Management

Treatment

 Peripheral retinal ablation is the mainstay of ROP treatment. The destruction of the avascular retina is performed with a solid state laser photocoagulation device, as these are easily portable to the operating room or neonatal ICU. Cryotherapy, an earlier technique in which regional retinal destruction was done using a probe to freeze the desired areas, has also been evaluated in multi-center clinical trials as an effective modality for prevention and treatment of ROP. However, when laser treatment is available, cryotherapy is no longer preferred for routine avascular retinal ablation in premature babies, due to the side effects of inflammation and lid swelling. Furthermore, recent trials have shown that treatment at an earlier stage of the disease gives better results.
 Scleral buckling and/or vitrectomy surgery may be considered for severe ROP (stages4 and5) for eyes that progress to retinal detachment. Few centers in the world specialize in this surgery, because of its attendant surgical risks and generally poor outcomes.
 Intravitreal injection of bevacizumab (Avastin) has been reported as a supportive measure in aggressive posterior retinopathy of prematurity. In a 2011 clinical trial comparing bevacizumab with conventional laser therapy, intravitreal bevacizumab monotherapy showed a significant benefit for zoneI but not zoneII disease when used to treat infants with stage3+ retinopathy of prematurity. Potential benefits of intravitreal Avastin injection over laser therapy include: reduction in level of anesthesia required, preservation of viable peripheral retina, and, possibly, reduced incidence of subsequent high refractive error. However, the safety of this new treatment has not yet been established in terms of ocular complications as well as systemic complications. The latter are theoretically possible, as the active ingredient of bevacizumab not only blocks the development of abnormal blood vessels in the eye but may also prevent the normal development ofother tissues such as the lung and kidney.  A 2018 Cochrane review also examined the effectiveness of Anti-vascular Endothelial Growth Factor Drugs and their use for ROP.
 Oral propranolol is being evaluated for counteracting the progression of ROP, but safety is a concern. A prospective randomized trial in which pre-term newborns were randomized to receiving oral propranolol with standard treatment or standard treatment alone found that oral propranolol showed a 48% relative risk reduction for progression to stage3, 58% reduction for progression to stage3 plus, and 100% reduction for progression to stage4. Furthermore, there was a 52% relative risk reduction for the need for laser treatment or intravitreal bevacizumab. However 19% of the newborns experienced serious adverse effects including hypotension and bradycardia. A study in a mouse model of human ROP has shown that beta-blockade is protective against retinal angiogenesis and ameliorate blood-retinal barrier dysfunction.

Follow up

 Once diagnosed with ROP lifelong follow up (yearly) is performed in some centers. In others, only children treated for ROP are followed yearly.
 Follow up after laser or anti-VEGF treatment is individualized.
 Follow up of premature children (with or without ROP) is varying among centers and countries, mirroring the diverse states of health care system in different countries.

Prognosis

Stages 1 and 2 do not lead to blindness. However, they can progress to the more severe stages. Threshold disease is defined as disease that has a 50% likelihood of progressing to retinal detachment. Threshold disease is considered to be present when stage3 ROP is present in either zoneI or zoneII, with at least five continuous or eight total clock hours of disease, and the presence of plus disease. Progression to stage4 (partial retinal detachment), or to stage5 (total retinal detachment), will result in substantial or total loss of vision for the infant.

 Refractive errors including myopia (most common)
 Strabismus
 Amblyopia
 Retinal detachment, traction of the retina and blindness
 Glaucoma
Impairments in visual acuity, contrast sensitivity, visual field, convergence, and accommodation

Epidemiology

ROP prevalence varies, from 5 to 8% in developed countries with adequate neonatological facilities, to up to 30% in middle-income developing countries.

There is increasing evidence that ROP and blindness due to ROP are now public health problems in the middle income countries of Latin America, Eastern Europe and the more advanced economies in South East Asia and the Middle east region. In these countries ROP is often the most common cause of blindness in children. ROP is highly likely to become an increasing problem in India, China and other countries in Asia as these countries expand the provision of services for premature infants.

There is also evidence that the population of premature infants at risk of severe ROP varies depending on the level of neonatal intensive care being provided. In countries with high development indices and very low neonatal mortality rates (e.g. North America, Western Europe), severe ROP is generally limited to extremely preterm infants i.e. those weighing less than 1 kg (2.2 lbs) at birth. At the other end of the development spectrum, countries with very low development indices and very high neonatal mortality rates (e.g. much of subSaharan Africa) ROP is rare as most premature babies do not have access to neonatal intensive care and so do not survive. Countries with moderate development indices are improving access to neonatal intensive care, and in these settings bigger, more mature babies are also at risk of severe ROP as neonatal care may be suboptimal. These findings have two main implications: firstly, much can be done in countries with moderate development indices to improve neonatal care, to reduce the risk of severe ROP in bigger babies and increase survival of extremely preterm infants, and secondly, in these settings bigger more mature babies need to be included in ROP programs and examined regularly so as to detect those babies developing ROP requiring treatment.

In 2012, the World Health Organization published data on rates of preterm birth and the number of premature babies born in different regions of the world. This report contained three main findings: 
 Premature birth has many different causes, and prevention is challenging,
 Prematurity is the most common cause of neonatal death in many countries, totaling as many as 1 million infants annually due to complications of preterm birth, and
 the number of preterm births is currently estimated to be 15 million, and increasing.

History

This disease was first described in a premature baby in 1942 as reported by Theodore L. Terry. Between 1941 and 1953, over 12,000 babies worldwide were affected by it. However, Dr Kate Isabel Campbell (1889-1986), a specialist in children's diseases, was actually responsible in 1951 for proving the link between retrolental fibroplasia (a blindness in premature babies) and oxygen levels in humidicribs.

Soul musician Stevie Wonder, actor Tom Sullivan, and jazz singer Diane Schuur are a few famous people who have the disease. The first case of the epidemic was seen on St. Valentine's Day in 1941 when a premature baby in Boston was diagnosed. Cases were then seen all over the world and the cause was, at that point, unknown. By 1951 a clear link between incidence and affluence became clear: many cases were seen in developed countries with organized and well-funded health care. Two British scientists suggested that it was oxygen toxicity that caused the disease. Babies born prematurely in such affluent areas were treated in incubators which had artificially high levels of oxygen. Studies on rats made this cause seem more likely, but the link was eventually confirmed by a controversial study undertaken by American pediatricians. The study involved two groups of babies. Some given the usual oxygen concentrations in their incubators, while the other group had "curtailed" oxygen levels. The latter group was shown to have a lower incidence of the disease. As a result, oxygen levels in incubators were lowered and consequently, the epidemic was halted. Each case of ROP avoided by withholding oxygen "may have cost some 16 deaths".

References

External links 
 Retinopathy of Prematurity Resource Guide from the National Eye Institute (NEI).
 Merck Manual entry on ROP
 World ROP Congress Archives of the International Conferences on ROP.

Blindness
Disorders of choroid and retina
Neonatology
Preterm birth